Empress Li (李皇后, personal name unknown) was an empress of the Chinese/Di state Former Qin.  Her husband was Fu Deng (Emperor Gao).

Very little is known about the empress.  She was already Fu Deng's concubine by 392, when Fu Deng created her empress to replace Empress Mao, who had been captured and killed by the rival Later Qin's emperor Yao Chang in 389.  In 393, when Fu Deng was captured and killed by Yao Chang's son and successor Yao Xing, Yao Xing gave her to his official Yao Huang (姚晃).  Nothing further was recorded about her.

References 

|-

Former Qin empresses